Sugar Mall is a defunct shopping center located in Rende District, Tainan, Taiwan. Owned by Taiwan Sugar Corporation, the main core stores of the mall include Carrefour, Showtime Cinemas, Poya, Tom's World and various themed restaurants. On 16 June 2019, the mall ended operation.

See also
List of tourist attractions in Taiwan

References 

2003 establishments in Taiwan
Shopping malls established in 2003
Shopping malls in Tainan
Defunct shopping malls in Taiwan
2019 disestablishments in Taiwan
Shopping malls disestablished in 2019